The Alberta Railway Museum (ARM) is a railway museum located in the north end of Edmonton, Alberta, Canada. It houses a collection of railway equipment and buildings and has locomotives from both the Canadian National Railways (CNR) and Northern Alberta Railways (NAR).

History
The Alberta Railway Museum opened in 1976 in a historic spot, on the former Canadian Northern Railway Coronado Subdivision. With the exception of summer staff, volunteers keep the museum operating. Funding comes from memberships, museum admissions, grants and casinos.

Collection 
The collection is in the process of being restored, with some cars already finished and others yet to be started. Some cars will be restored to nearly original condition while others will be restored to "last used".

CNR passenger train
These cars are the beginning of the Museum's planned consist of a CNR passenger train.
CN 6514 and 6614
10648 Express Refrigerator
11141 Through Baggage
7815 Mail Express
8730 Baggage
Regina
Pelee Island
Fort Brabant

CNR prairie mixed freight train
The following cars are a typical consist of a prairie mixed freight. Other cars may be added as they become available.
1392 Locomotive
16015 Tender (1392B)
46230 Refrigerator
172755 Stock Car
477871 Box Car
509893 Box Car
512719 Box Car
17913 Box Car
6570 Tank Car
16040 Tank Car
7379 Combine
78185 Caboose

Northern Alberta Railways passenger train
These eight cars are part of the Museum's planned consist representing a complete NAR passenger train, the only one in existence.
73 Locomotive
1454 Mail Express
1460 Mail Express
1220 Express
Rycroft
Westlock
Dunvegan

NAR work train
This lineup represents a typical Northern Alberta Railways work train and is the only surviving complete set.
16511 Flat Car
15015 Flat Car
14040 Ballast Car
14085 Ballast Car
16601 Flanger
16522 Jordan Spreader
68301 Outfit Car
CP 409748 Outfit Car
51625 Tank Car
69695 Bunk Car
17050 Bunk Car
17900 Engineering Car
17009 Foreman and Tool Car
17032 Cook Supply Car
17062 Cook Car
17092 Box Car
13025 Caboose

Auxiliary train
This collection, including the "Big Hook" (63017) and its more modern cousin 50387, consists of an auxiliary or wreck train.
63017 Crane
57611 Idler
50387 Crane / 54597 Idler
51566 (401) Tender
28251 Flat Car
58285 Gondola
18104 Bunk Car

Special interest equipment
Other significant locomotives and cars.
CN 9000 EMD F3A locomotive
CN 7944 EMD NW2 locomotive
Alberta & Great Waterways Railway 17106 combine passenger car
CN 15029 Rule Instruction Car (formerly Canadian Government Railways sleeper)
CN 55245 Snowplow (formerly Northern Alberta Railways)
NAR 306 Coach Caboose (formerly Boston and Albany Railroad)
CN 50800 load test car

See also

List of heritage railways in Canada
List of museums in Canada

References

External links

Official site

Museums in Edmonton
Railway station museums in Alberta
Museums established in 1976